Mize is an unincorporated community in Stephens County, in the U.S. state of Georgia.

History
The community was named after Henry Mize, a pioneer settler. A post office called Mize was established in 1888, and remained in operation until 1935.

References

Unincorporated communities in Stephens County, Georgia